is a JR West Geibi station located in Ōsa, Saijō-chō, Shōbara, Hiroshima Prefecture, Japan. While it was formerly an express train stop, there are currently no express trains operating east of Miyoshi Station.

History
1934-03-15: Bingo-Saijō Station opens with the Shōbara Line between this station and Bingo-Shōbara Station.
1987-04-01: Japan National Railways is privatized, and Bingo-Saijō Station becomes a JR West station

Station layout
Bingo-Saijō Station features one side platform and one island platform. 
Platform 1: Geibi Line (toward Miyoshi Station)
Platform 2: Geibi Line (toward Bingo-Ochiai Station)

Around the station
The Saijō Municipal Hospital is about 0.5 km from the station. Saijō Junior High School is about 1 km from station, and offers a view of the center of town.

Highway access
Japan National Route 183
Hiroshima Prefectural Route 233 (Bingo Saijō Teishajō Route)
Hiroshima Prefectural Route 26 (Shin'ichi Nanamagari Saijō Route)
Hiroshima Prefectural Route 57 (Tōjō-Saijō Route)
Hiroshima Prefectural Route 58 (Saijō-Hiwa Route)

References

External links
 JR West

Geibi Line
Railway stations in Hiroshima Prefecture
Railway stations in Japan opened in 1934
Shōbara, Hiroshima